Sa Re Ga Ma Pa Bangla 2022 is the 18th season of the longest running Bengali language singing reality show of Sa Re Ga Ma Pa Bangla that aired on 11 June 2022 and concluded on 5 February 2023.

Auditions 
The channel started taking auditions for this season through online audition. Then the offline auditions started on 3 April 2022 and placed in Berhampore, Siliguri, Midnapore, Durgapur, Kolkata, etc.

Judges 
The channel approaches Srikanto Acharya, Richa Sharma and Shantanu Moitra as the judging panel for this season.

Guests

Top 21 Participants

Child participants

Grand Master 
Ajoy Chakrabarty is appointed as the grand master of this season. In fact, this is the first season of this show where grand master is included.

Judges and host

Mentors

References 

Bengali-language television programming in India
Sa Re Ga Ma Pa
2022 Indian television seasons
Zee Bangla original programming